Watsons Creek is a bounded locality in Victoria, Australia, 31 km north-east of Melbourne's Central Business District, located within the Shire of Nillumbik local government area. Watsons Creek recorded a population of 58 at the 2021 census.

Watsons Creek lies to the north and west of Eltham-Yarra Glen Road.

History
Watsons Creek was named after Sandy Watson, who farmed fat cattle and sold butter and meat to the miners on the One Tree Hill, Happy Valley and Queenstown diggings.

A Watsons Creek Post Office was open in 1903 and 1904. Watson's Post Office opened on 11 September 1911, was renamed Chiselhurst later that year and closed in 1923.

Today
Watson's Creek is quickly becoming known for Gallery 7six5, an art gallery at 765D Eltham-Yarra Glen Road that displays artwork from Nillumbik Artists exclusively. The property also boasts beautiful Air B&B accommodation and a cafe.

See also
 Shire of Eltham – Watsons Creek was previously within this former local government area.

References

Towns in Victoria (Australia)
Shire of Nillumbik